Benti may refer to:

People
 Galeazzo Benti (1923–1993), Italian actor
 Joseph Benti, American former television presenter
 Ketema Benti (born 1945), Ethiopian former sprinter
 Tafari Benti (1921–1977), Ehtiopian military officer and politician

Places
 Benti, Uttar Pradesh, India, a village